Dario Chiazzolino (born February 8, 1985) is a guitarist, composer, arranger, producer, and award-winning artist based in New York City. He has played with Bob Mintzer, Billy Cobham, and the Yellowjackets.

Early life 
Dario Chiazzolino was born in Turin, Italy. He began playing the guitar at the age of 12. He graduated from Giuseppe Verdi Conservatory in Turin and the University of Music in Rome.

Career 
As a teen, he started playing jazz with several Italian jazz artists. Musicians such as Charlie Parker, Clifford Brown, Miles Davis and Bill Evans influenced his music. In the summer of 2006, he participated in Umbria Jazz Festival, where he was named "Best Guitar Player"; he joined Berklee/Umbria Jazz Clinics 2006 Award Group. He played at the Umbria Jazz Winter Festival with this band. During his career, he has played with jazz artists such as Billy Cobham, Yellowjackets, Horacio "El Negro" Hernandez, Bob Mintzer, Russell Ferrante, William Kennedy, Jimmy Haslip, Felix Pastorius, Julio Barreto and Dave Liebman.

In 2010, he took part in a Latin Jazz project; he recorded the album named Proposition, with Dany Noel Martinez on bass, Horacio Hernandez on drums, Ivan Bridon and Ivan Melon Lewis on piano, Carlos Sandy on trumpet and with guest singer Concha Buika and other main Latin icons as Ramón Porrina, Jerry Gonzáles, Infidel González, Javier Masso "Caramelo," Fernando Favier, Diego Guerrero, Ivette Falcón Urgate and Daniel Martínez Miranda.

He recorded the album Paint your life in January 2011. The band is formed by: Chiazzolino, Taylor Eigsti, Marco Panascia, Willie Jones, III.

He played with the Principles Sound project. This band is formed by Yellowjackets members Bob Mintzer, Russell Ferrante and Jimmy Haslip. With them, he recorded the album Lost in the Jungle. After that, Dario participated in the Yellowjackets 2012 Tour.

He recorded the album Rewriting Song with the Italian guitarist Nico Di Battista in June 2013. He also recorded in a duo with the Cuban bassist Dany Noel Martinez the same year: their album is named Confidence.

Chiazzolino founded his new quartet to record his new leader album. He recorded Red Cloud with the pianist Antonio Faraò, the bassist Dominique Di Piazza, and the drummer Manhu Roche in 2014.

He was on tour with the saxophonist Andy Sheppard in 2014.

He has collaborated with musicians like Billy Cobham, Dave Liebman, Bobby Watson, Richard Bona, Bob Mintzer, Yellowjackets, Sylvain Luc, Peter Bernstein (guitarist), Jonathan Kreisberg, Aaron Goldberg, Hadrien Feraud, Dee Dee Bridgewater, Pino Daniele, Ornella Vanoni and many others.

Discography

Albums as leader 
2010: Bewitched – with Pit Linsky, Greg Miller.
2011 Paint your life – with Taylor Eigsti, Marco Panascia, Willie Jones III.
2011 The best thing for you – with Rick Stone.
2011 Very Early – with Dario Deidda, Gaetano Fasano.
2013 Rewriting Songs – with Nico Di Battista.
2013 Confidence – with Dany Noel Martinez.
2012 Lost in the jungle – with Bob Mintzer, Russel Ferrante, Jimmy Haslip.
2014 Red Cloud – with Antonio Faraò, Dominique Di Piazza, Manhu Roche.
2016 The Ninth Gig – New Generation Trio featuring Dario Chiazzolino
2022 I Am Ready – Dario Chiazzolino, Federico Malaman, Max Furian

Albums as sideman 
2008: Six Strings – with Marc Didegrot, Emilie Elia, John Grael, Joe Kindman, Kirk Fairten, Joël Patrick
2008: Swing me – with CB Orchestra
2009: Six Strings – with Mathias Krüger, Vincent Körtig, Joël Patrick, Damien Werner, Joe Kindman, Joël Patrick
2009: Torino Jazz Lab – with Furio Di Castri, Bruno Tommaso, Torino Jazz Orchestra.
2010: Six Strings – with Antony Rives, Andrea Schmidt, Rian Fisher, Johan Mùller
2010: Proposcion – with Dany Noel Martinez, Horacio "El Negro" Hernandez , Ivan Bridon, Concha Buika
2009: Torino Jazz Lab – con Furio Di Castri, Javier Girotto, Torino Jazz Orchestra.
2010: Kabel – with Giovanni Falzone, Kabel Ensamble
2011: Virgen – with Ivan Bridon, Sofie Reinhardt
2011: Tinta Unida – with Dany Noel Martinez, Benjamin Santiago Molina, Juan Carlos González, Dani Morales, Diego Guerriero
2011: Nuovi Segnali Acustici – with Nico DI Battista, Roberto Taufic, Gino Evangelista, Giovanni Unterberger
2014: Untidiness – with Chiara Raggi, Aaron Goldberg, Ugonna Ogekwo, Lawrence Leathers.
2018: Polyrhythmic – with Greg Spero, Hadrien Feraud, Mike Mitchell.
2019: Blua Horizonto – Chiara Raggi
2020: Piano & Guitar Improvisation – Dario Chiazzolino & Greg Spero.
2020: Goodbye – Spirit Fingers feat. Judi Jackson – with Greg Spero, Dario Chiazzolino, Max Gerl, Mike Mitchell, Judi Jackson.
2020: Peace – Spirit Fingers with Greg Spero, Dario Chiazzolino, Max Gerl, Mike Mitchell.

Awards 
2006: Umbria Jazz Award, Umbria Jazz Festival, IT
2007: Torino Jazz Lab
2011: Best Guitarist, Italian Jazz, IT
2011: Archivio Chitarristi Jazz Italiani, IT
2012: Artista dell'Anno, Dmagazine, IT
2013: Top Jazz Guitar Competition, UK
2015: Best Guitarist, Guitarlist, IT
2015: Top 15, Suono, IT

Equipment 
Chiazzolino has endorsed Randall Amplifiers, DR Handmade Strings, Gibson.
Dario Chiazzolino is currently an endorser of D'Angelico Guitars, DV Mark, Hosa Technology, Dogal Strings, Keeley Electronics, Millennia, Kinman, Aria Sounds, Slinger Straps, and Crossrock.

References

External links 
Official website

1985 births
Living people
21st-century guitarists
Italian guitarists
Italian jazz guitarists
Italian male guitarists
Lead guitarists
21st-century Italian male musicians
Male jazz musicians
Yellowjackets members